Mary Rokonadravu is a story writer from Fiji. She was the first Fijian to win the Pacific regional Commonwealth Short Story Prize twice in 2015 and 2022.

Career
Rokonadravu was the first Fijian to win the Pacific regional Commonwealth Short Story Prize for her short story "Famished Eels" in 2015. She was also shortlisted for the same award in 2017.

She has directed a prison writing programme at Suva's seven correctional facilities for four years and in 2008, she published shedding Silences, the Pacific's first anthology of prison writing. In 2017, Rokonadravu launched a writing competition under the banner of the Fiji Media Watch Group.

Rokonadravu was again awarded with the Commonwealth Short Story Prize for her story The Nightwatch in 2022.

Awards

Books
 Famished Eels — A short story narrating inter-family and regional relations.
 Sepia

See also
 Fijian literature

References

Living people
Fijian writers
Fijian women writers
21st-century Fijian writers
Year of birth missing (living people)